Moses Bruine Cotsworth (Willitoft, Yorks 3 December 1859 – Vancouver 4 June 1943) was a British accountant, business analyst, and calendar reformer.

He started his career in a variety of companies where his analytical skills were valuable.  Based on his work at the North Eastern Railway Company, he published a book on railway rates. In 1907, he was chosen to chair a commission to reorganize the British Columbia civil service.

His interest in calendar reform began when he was working at a railroad company. He found that monthly accounting was greatly complicated by the fact that months did not divide evenly into weeks. He devised what is now known as the International Fixed Calendar, a solar calendar in which each of 13 months has 28 days. In 1922, he founded the International Fixed Calendar League in an effort to gain adoption of his calendar by businesses and government. American entrepreneur George Eastman adopted the calendar for use in his Eastman Kodak Company, where it was used from 1928 to 1982. 

Later in life Cotsworth moved to British Columbia. He died in Vancouver.

Legacy and honors
Cotsworth was elected as a Fellow of the Institute of Chartered Accountants, of the Royal Statistical Society, and of the Geological Society.

References

 Francesca Rossetti, Inventory of the Moses Bruine Cotsworth Fonds at the Library of the University of British Columbia, March 2000. 

Chronologists
People from Bubwith
English emigrants to Canada

1859 births
1943 deaths